The field Hockey competition at the 2010 Central American and Caribbean Games was held in Mayagüez, Puerto Rico. The men's tournament was scheduled to be held from July 22–31, 2010, with the women's tournament finishing one day earlier, at the Parque Yldefonso Solá Morales in Caguas.

Medal summary

Medalists

Medal table

Men's tournament

Mexico won their first gold medal by defeating Trinidad and Tobago 3–2 in the final. Barbados won the bronze medal by defeating the Netherlands Antilles 3–0.

Preliminary round

Pool A

Pool B

Fifth to eighth place classification

5–8th place semi-finals

Seventh place game

Fifth place game

Medal round

Semi-finals

Bronze medal match

Gold medal match

Final standings

Women's tournament

Trinidad and Tobago won their third gold medal by defeating Mexico 4–0 in the final. Barbados won the bronze medal by defeating the Dominican Republic 3–1.

Preliminary round

Pool A

Pool B

Fifth to eighth place classification

Medal round

Final standings

External links

Official PAHF website

Events at the 2010 Central American and Caribbean Games
Qualification for the 2011 Pan American Games
July 2010 sports events in North America
C
2010
2010 Central American and Caribbean Games